Moondru Mudichu is a 1976 Indian Tamil-language romantic thriller film directed and co-written by K. Balachander. A remake of the Telugu film O Seeta Katha (1973), it stars Kamal Haasan, Sridevi and Rajinikanth. The film revolves around an 18-year-old girl and two roommates who fall in love with her.

Moondru Mudichu marked Sridevi's first leading adult role at the age of 13, and Rajinikanth's first major role in Tamil. It was released on 22 October 1976 and became a success.

Plot 

Balaji and Prasath are roommates in a city. Balaji falls in love with 18-year-old Selvi who lives in the same apartment complex. Prasath, who has his eyes on Selvi, pretends to back Balaji's love while secretly hoping to create a divide between them. Selvi realises Prasath's evil intentions when she finds out that he has seduced an innocent girl living in the same apartment complex. However, she is unable to convince Balaji, who hero-worships Prasath.

Things come to a head when Balaji and Selvi go for a picnic by the lake and Balaji decides to invite Prasath along. As the three of them head to the middle of the lake on a boat, Balaji topples over by mistake. Prasath refuses to jump in and save Balaji, on the pretext that he does not know swimming. A devastated Selvi returns home to another shock – her sister, who plays small roles in movies, has been in a fire accident which has left her face permanently scarred. Overnight, Selvi's life undergoes a change .

Selvi comes across a advertisement in paper for a second marriage to a wealthy man with 4 kids  and applies for the same. However the elderly person refuses for marriage with a young girl and asks her to take care of the kids. Impressed by her Service, he decides to marry her to his eldest son, whom unknown to her was Prasath.

Seeing Selvi in his house seems like a deer in lion's den for Prasath who visits his father during the weekend.  Prasath tries his best to convince his father for his marriage with Selvi and fixes the date. In meantime chasing Selvi, Prasath goes to Selvi house and spots the burnt face of her sister. Unable to see the face, he returns immediately.  The sister humiliated by Prasaths act commits suicide , leaving Selvi with no one in the World

In an attempt to salvage her life, Selvi decides to marry Prasath's father in the absence of Prasath, before he returns the next weekend.
After her marriage to Prasath's father, she decides to use her 'mother' status to exact revenge on Prasath and gives him a shock when he returns.

The movie ends with lines in Tamil, roughly translating to: "When it is time for a seed to sprout, if the conscience cannot empathise; and only after the incident, is the conscience present! When conscience grapples with oneself for selfish ends; in the evildoer's eyes, his madness will be his conscience!"

Cast 

 Kamal Haasan as Balaji
 Sridevi as Selvi
 Rajinikanth as Prasath
 Y. Vijaya as Subhadra
 N. Viswanath as the unnamed widower

 K. Natraj as Prasath's consciousness

Production 
Moondru Mudichu is a remake of the 1973 Telugu film O Seeta Katha. Jayabharathi was offered to play a negative role but did not accept, resulting in Rajinikanth being cast. It was Rajinikanth's first major role in Tamil. Kamal Haasan, who portrayed a negative role in O Seeta Kathas Malayalam remake Mattoru Seetha (1975), played a different role this time. This was the first film where Sridevi played an adult character, despite being 13 years old. She was paid 5000, Haasan was paid 30,000 and Rajinikanth was paid 2000.

Soundtrack 
The soundtrack was composed by M. S. Viswanathan and lyrics were by Kannadasan.

Release and reception 
Moondru Mudichu was released on 22 October 1976, Diwali day. Kanthan of Kalki called the pre-interval portions better than the post-interval ones. The film became a success, and many of Prasath's traits became signature moves of Rajinikanth in his future films such as his tendency to flip cigarettes into his mouth; critic Naman Ramachandran felt that with Prasath's recurring catchphrase "Theek Hai?" (Okay?), "the seed for future Rajini catchphrases had been sown."

References

Bibliography

External links 
 

1970s romantic thriller films
1970s Tamil-language films
1976 films
Films about women in India
Films directed by K. Balachander
Films scored by M. S. Viswanathan
Films with screenplays by K. Balachander
Indian black-and-white films
Indian romantic thriller films
Tamil remakes of Telugu films